The National Monument of the Republic of Ciskei: Ntaba kaNdoda is located in Dimbaza, South Africa. It was commissioned by President of Ciskei Lennox Sebe, and was opened by him on August 14, 1981. The memorial was created with the intention of commemorating those Xhosa chiefs who died in the dispute with the white colonizers over land use rights.

References 

Monuments and memorials in South Africa